Brenda Bowskill (born 21 April 1992 in Toronto, Ontario) is a Canadian sailor. Bowskill finished in eighth place at the 2015 Pan American Games in the laser radial event. Bowskill has also qualified to compete at the 2016 Summer Olympics.

References

External links
Official website

1992 births
Living people
Canadian female sailors (sport)
Olympic sailors of Canada
Sailors at the 2016 Summer Olympics – Laser Radial
Pan American Games competitors for Canada
Sailors at the 2015 Pan American Games
Sportspeople from Toronto